This is a list of people executed in the United States in 2018. A total of twenty-five people, all male, were executed in the United States in 2018; of whom 23 died by lethal injection and two, in Tennessee, by electrocution, marking the first calendar year since 2000 in which more than one inmate was executed in that way.

List of people executed in the United States in 2018

Demographics

Executions in recent years

See also
 List of death row inmates in the United States
 List of juveniles executed in the United States since 1976
 List of most recent executions by jurisdiction
 List of people scheduled to be executed in the United States
 List of women executed in the United States since 1976

References

List of people executed in the United States
Executions
People executed in the United States
2018
Male murderers